Mair Eluned Morgan, Baroness Morgan of Ely (born 16 February 1967) is a Welsh Labour politician serving as Minister for Health and Social Services in the Welsh Government since 2021. Morgan has served as a Member of the House of Lords since 2011 and as a Member of the Senedd (MS) since 2016. She was previously Minister for the Welsh Language from 2017 to 2021, Minister for Mental Health and Wellbeing from 2020 to 2021, and a Member of the European Parliament (MEP) from 1994 to 2009.

From 2013–2016, Morgan served as the Shadow Minister for Wales in the House of Lords, and from 2014 to 2016 she served as Shadow Minister for Foreign Affairs and also as a whip. She was granted a peerage in 2011 and is formally known as Baroness Morgan of Ely.  She was responsible for leading for Labour in the House of Lords on the EU Referendum Bill and led for Labour on two Wales Bills.

Morgan is a former Member of the European Parliament who represented Wales for the Labour Party from 1994 to 2009. In this role she became the Labour spokesperson on industry, science and energy and spokesperson for the 200 strong Socialist Group on Budget Control matters. She authored the Green Paper on energy on behalf of the Parliament and led its discussions on the Electricity Directive where she ensured new rights for consumers and demanded that Member States of the EU addressed the issue of fuel poverty.

From late 2009 until July 2013, Morgan worked as the Director of National Business Development in Wales for SSE (SWALEC) one of the UK's largest energy companies. She was responsible for the establishment of the SWALEC Smart Energy Centre in Treforest. She was also appointed as the Chair of the Cardiff Business Partnership.

Morgan's political career started at the age of 27 when she was elected as the youngest Member of the European Parliament in 1994. She was only the fifth woman elected to a full-time political position in the history of Wales, and the first full-time politician in Wales to have a baby whilst in office. Initially, she represented the constituency of Mid and West Wales, and was subsequently re-elected in 1999 and 2004 under the new proportional representation system representing the whole of Wales.

Biography
Eluned Morgan was born and brought up in Ely, Cardiff, the daughter of Revd Canon Bob Morgan and Elaine Morgan. [2][3] Educated at Ysgol Gyfun Gymraeg Glantaf,  she won a scholarship to the United World College of the Atlantic and gained a degree in European Studies from the University of Hull.[1] Morgan formerly worked as a researcher for S4C, Agenda TV and the BBC.

European Parliament
In 1990, she worked as a stagiaire in the European Parliament for the Socialist Group.

In 1994, Morgan was elected as a Member of the European Parliament representing Mid and West Wales. At the time she was the youngest MEP when she took up her seat. She continued as an MEP representing the Wales being elected at both the 1999 and 2004 elections.

Eluned Morgan served as the budget control spokesperson for the 180 strong Socialist Group. She was also the Labour Party's European spokesperson on Energy, Industry and Science. She was responsible for drafting the European Parliament's response to the Energy Green Paper and also took the lead role in negotiating on behalf of the Parliament the revision of the Electricity Directive.

In 2007, she nominated Peter Hain as a candidate for Deputy Leader of the UK Labour Party.

She stood down at the 2009 European Parliament elections.

After European Parliament
On leaving the Parliament she worked as the Director of National Development for SSE in Wales (SWALEC) from 2009 to June 2013 where she was responsible for establishing the new SWALEC Smart Energy Centre in Treforest. She was appointed Chair of the Cardiff Business Partnership.

On 19 November 2010 it was announced that Morgan had been granted a life peerage and would sit on the Labour benches of the House of Lords, [4] and was gazetted on 27 January 2011 as Baroness Morgan of Ely, of Ely in the City of Cardiff.[5][6]

Welsh Parliament and Welsh Government

In 2015 Morgan was selected as a candidate for the 2016 Welsh election on the Mid and West Wales regional list. [7] On 5 May 2016 she was elected from the regional list as an Assembly Member in the Senedd.

In November 2017 she was appointed Minister for Welsh Language and Lifelong Learning. Morgan became the Minister for International Relations and the Welsh Language in December 2018.

Morgan contested the 2018 Welsh Labour leadership election. She was then appointed by First Minister Mark Drakeford as Minister for International Relations and the Welsh Language before being moved to Minister for Mental Health, Wellbeing and the Welsh Language in October 2020.

Personal and other
Eluned Morgan served on the Welsh Labour Party Executive for ten years and was appointed to the Welsh Assembly Advisory Group, which was responsible for developing the standing orders of the Senedd. She was a founding member of the Yes for Wales Cross-party group, which campaigned for the Assembly to be established.

Morgan is a Fellow of Trinity College Carmarthen and is an Honorary-Distinguished Professor and Fellow of Cardiff University. She served on the board of the International Baccalaureate Organisation for three years. She was the Chair of the Cardiff Business Partnership.[9] She was a member of the External Advisory Board to the Wales Governance Centre.[10] She served on the Council of Atlantic College. She was Chair of Live Music Now in Wales, a charity which sends talented young musicians to care homes and special schools and demonstrates the transformational impact of music.[11]

Morgan is married to Rev Dr Rhys Jenkins, who is a GP and also a non-stipendiary priest.

Morgan's family hails from St David's in Pembrokeshire.

In March 2022, Morgan was banned from driving for 6 months for speeding on a 30mph road in Wrexham

Notes

References

External links

1967 births
Living people
Alumni of the University of Hull
Politicians from Cardiff
People educated at Ysgol Gyfun Gymraeg Glantaf
People educated at Atlantic College
People educated at a United World College
MEPs for Wales 1994–1999
MEPs for Wales 1999–2004
MEPs for Wales 2004–2009
20th-century women MEPs for Wales
21st-century women MEPs for Wales
SSE plc
Labour Party (UK) life peers
Life peeresses created by Elizabeth II
Welsh Labour MEPs
Welsh-speaking politicians
Welsh Labour members of the Senedd
Wales MSs 2016–2021
Wales MSs 2021–2026